Nicolás Barrientos and Sergio Galdós were the defending champions but chose not to defend their title.

Yuki Bhambri and Saketh Myneni won the title after defeating JC Aragone and Roberto Quiroz 4–6, 6–3, [10–7] in the final.

Seeds

Draw

References

External links
 Main draw

Salinas Challenger - Doubles